

Walter Hugo Botsch (27 February 1897 – 7 January 1969) was a German general during World War II who commanded the 19th Army. He was a recipient of the Knight's Cross of the Iron Cross of Nazi Germany.

Awards 
 Iron Cross (1914) 2nd Class & 1st Class 
 Honour Cross of the World War 1914/1918 (21 January 1935)
 Clasp to the Iron Cross (1939) 2nd Class (20 April 1940) & 1st Class (19 June 1940)
 German Cross in Gold on 22 June 1942 as Oberst im Generalstab in the XXX. Armeekorps
 Knight's Cross of the Iron Cross on 9 May 1945 as Generalleutnant and acting leader of the LVIII. Panzerkorps

Notes

References

Citations

Bibliography

 
 
 
 

1897 births
1969 deaths
Lieutenant generals of the German Army (Wehrmacht)
Recipients of the clasp to the Iron Cross, 1st class
Recipients of the Gold German Cross
Recipients of the Knight's Cross of the Iron Cross
German prisoners of war in World War II held by the United States
People from the Kingdom of Württemberg
Missing in action of World War II
Military personnel from Baden-Württemberg